The chairman of the Voronezh Oblast Duma is the presiding officer of that legislature.

Office-holders 
Ivan Shabanov 1994-1997
Anataoly Goliusov 1997-2001
Alexey Nakvasin 2001-2005
Yury Titov 2005 
Vladimir Klyuchnikov 2005-incumbent

References 

Lists of legislative speakers in Russia
Politics of Voronezh Oblast